Patrick Roberto Daniel da Silva commonly known as Patrick (born 26 March 1985) is a Brazilian footballer plays for Liga Futebol Timor-Leste club Karketu Dili.

Career
Patrick played in the youth academies of Portuguesa and São Paulo before he began his professional career in 2003 with Vitória. In the summer of 2004, he moved to Mexican club Altamira, but returned to Brazil in early 2005 and first played for Mogi Mirim. In the course of the year, he moved to Grêmio Barueri and played there until 2007. After a short stay at Nacional, he moved to the Australian A-League for Sydney FC in August 2007.

At Sydney, Patrick played alongside his compatriot Juninho Paulista and scored two goals in eight appearances under manager Branko Čulina at the start of the season. After Čulina's dismissal in October 2007, he lost his position in the team under his successor John Kosmina and only made a brief appearance in the play-off semifinals against Queensland Roar in late January 2008. His contract was not renewed at the end of the season and Patrick continued his career with América de Natal in 2009. Later, he played at various clubs in Asia followed, among others Krabi, Thanh Hóa, Persija Jakarta, and most recently Barito Putera. He left the latter on 1 April 2018.

On 9 November 2021, Patrick made his comeback after more than three years without a club. He began playing for Liga Futebol Timor-Leste club Karketu Dili.

References

1985 births
Living people
Brazilian footballers
Brazilian expatriate footballers
São Paulo FC players
Esporte Clube Vitória players
Grêmio Barueri Futebol players
Brazilian expatriate sportspeople in Mexico
Expatriate footballers in Mexico
Sydney FC players
A-League Men players
Brazilian expatriate sportspeople in Australia
Expatriate soccer players in Australia
DPMM FC players
Brazilian expatriate sportspeople in Brunei
Expatriate footballers in Brunei
Saham SC players
Brazilian expatriate sportspeople in Oman
Expatriate footballers in Oman
Krabi F.C. players
Brazilian expatriate sportspeople in Thailand
Expatriate footballers in Thailand
Thanh Hóa FC players
V.League 1 players
Brazilian expatriate sportspeople in Vietnam
Expatriate footballers in Vietnam
Association football forwards
Brazilian expatriate sportspeople in Indonesia
Expatriate footballers in Indonesia
PS Barito Putera players
Persegres Gresik players
Gresik United players
Persija Jakarta players
Esporte Clube São Bento players
América Futebol Clube (RN) players
Nacional Atlético Clube (SP) players
Footballers from São Paulo